USS Lunga Point (CVE-94), originally named Alazon Bay, was a  of the United States Navy. It was named for Lunga Point on the northern coast of Guadalcanal, the site of a naval battle during World War II. The ship notably participated in support of the landings on Iwo Jima and Okinawa. Post war, the ship was decommissioned in 1946, before becoming part of the Pacific Reserve Fleet. In 1960, the ship was struck from the Navy list and broken up.

Design and description

Lunga Point was a Casablanca-class escort carrier, the most numerous type of aircraft carriers ever built, and designed specifically to be mass-produced using prefabricated sections, in order to replace heavy early war losses. She displaced  standard,  with a full load. Her compact size necessitated the installment of an aircraft catapult at her bow end, and there were two aircraft elevators to facilitate movement of aircraft between the flight and hangar deck: one on the fore, another on the aft.

One  /38 caliber dual purpose gun was mounted on the stern, and she was equipped with 16 Bofors 40 mm anti-aircraft guns in twin mounts, as well as 12 Oerlikon 20 mm cannons, which were used in an anti-aircraft capability. By the end of the war, Casablanca-class carriers had been modified to carry 30 20 mm cannons, as a response to increasing casualties due to kamikaze attacks. Anti-aircraft guns were mounted around the perimeter of the deck. Casablanca-class escort carriers were designed to carry 27 aircraft, but she sometimes went over or under this number. For example, during the Philippines campaign, she carried 14 FM-2 fighters and 12 TBM-3 torpedo bombers, for a total of 26 aircraft. However, during the Iwo Jima campaign and the Okinawa campaign, she carried 18 FM-2 fighters, 11 TBM-3 torpedo bombers, and a TBM-3P reconnaissance plane, for a total of 30 aircraft.

Construction
Her construction was awarded to Kaiser Shipbuilding Company, Vancouver, Washington under a Maritime Commission contract, on 18 June 1942, under the name Alazon Bay, as part of a tradition which named escort carriers after bays or sounds in Alaska. She was laid down on 19 January 1944 under a Maritime Commission contract, MC hull 1131, by Kaiser Shipbuilding Company of Vancouver, Washington. She was launched on 11 April 1944; sponsored by Mrs. Mary Elizabeth McKay. She was renamed Lunga Point, and was transferred to the United States Navy and commissioned on 14 May 1944, Captain G. A. T. Washburn in command.

Service history

World War II

Following a period of brief training in the months following her commissioning, Lunga Point sailed for the Pacific to ferry United States Army bombers to New Guinea and to bring damaged P-47 Thunderbolts back to the United States. She departed San Diego, California on 16 October to participate in the Leyte Gulf operations, touching Pearl Harbor, Eniwetok, and Kossol Roads en route. From 13 to 22 November, she provided air cover for transports and surface units engaged in the campaign. Relieved on the 23rd, she sailed to Manus Island, Admiralty Islands, to prepare for the Luzon campaign.

Philippine Sea

Lunga Point sailed on 27 December from Manus to supply air support for 6th Army landing operations at Lingayen Gulf. These planes split into two groups, one group heading towards the rear of the task group, whilst the other continued on its course towards the center. Albeit fighters from the carrier group was scrambled, false radar signals hampered their efforts to intercept, and the only successful interception was when P-47 fighters intercepted two enemy planes, shooting down one. The other plane escaped, and is believed to be the kamikaze which would attack . A lack of radar contacts led the task group to believe that the enemy planes had called off their attack.

At 17:12, a Yokosuka P1Y dove onto Ommaney Bay, rupturing the fire mains and sparking a fire which quickly became untenable. She quickly sank, with the loss of 95 crewmen. Minutes after Ommaney Bay was hit, a second kamikaze dove towards Lunga Point. Gunners on the battleship  and cruiser , joined with anti-aircraft fire on Lunga Point, tore the kamikaze apart. The flaming wreckage passed over her, about a hundred feet above her stern, showering her deck with metal fragments, which slightly wounded two men.

For the next few days, her task group fought their way through 14 enemy attacks, the majority of them kamikazes, most of which were repelled through excellent fighter cover and anti-aircraft fire. She arrived off Lingayen Gulf on 6 January, commencing 11 days of intensive air support during which time her aircraft flew an average of 41 sorties a day. On 17 January, the support carriers were withdrawn and returned to Ulithi.

Iwo Jima
 
 
From 23 January 1945 to 10 February, Lunga Point prepared for the invasion of Iwo Jima, and stood off the beaches with the amphibious forces, acting as target coordinators and striking enemy positions during the landings on 19 February.

On 16 February 1945, Vice-Admiral Kimpei Teroaka authorized the formation of a kamikaze special attack unit to counter the imminent landings on Iwo Jima. The kamikaze force consisted of twelve fighters, twelve carrier bombers, and eight torpedo bombers, divided into five groups, thirty-two aircraft in total. On the early morning of 21 February, they departed from Katori Naval Air Base, in Asahi, Chiba. They refueled at Hachijō-jima, and then proceeded towards the U.S. naval contingent surrounding Iwo Jima, arriving near sunset.

On the evening of 21 February, Lunga Point was performing routine close air support with the rest of Task Group 77.4. At 18:45, the task group spotted the Japanese planes headed for them, when a Mitsubishi G4M made a dive towards Lunga Point. Gunners from Bismarck Sea shot it down. At 18:46, five Nakajima B6Ns dove towards Lunga Point. The first plane, approaching from the starboard missed with its torpedo, passing harmlessly in front of Lunga Point. It subsequently crashed into the ocean at a high velocity. The second plane also missed with its torpedo, but managed to disengage and fly away. The third plane also missed with its torpedo, which proceeded behind the stern, and, set aflame and damaged heavily, attempted to crash into the carrier, approaching from the starboard side. The kamikaze exploded before it could hit the ship, and the wreckage of the plane skidded across the deck, and off the side of the carrier, sparking a brief gasoline fire. The fourth plane detonated in mid-air, due to a direct hit from a  anti-aircraft shell. The fifth plane switched targets to Bismarck Sea, sinking it with the loss of 318 lives. Damage to Lunga Point was minimal, and eleven of her crew was wounded. There were no fatalities. She was able to continue operating in support of troops on Iwo Jima.

Bismarck Sea was the only ship to sink as a result of the attacks. The kamikaze attacks killed 43 Japanese in total.

She supported operations on Iwo Jima until 8 March, when land-based planes were present in sufficient strength to allow the ship to return to Ulithi to get ready for the Okinawa campaign. When Lunga Point returned to Ulithi, she only had six bombs left in her magazine, having dropped 596 in support of operations on Iwo Jima.

Okinawa

The ship re-provisioned, and on 21 March sortied from Ulithi with Rear Admiral Clifton Sprague's Task Unit. Three days later, on 24 March, she, along with her task group, arrived south of Kerama Retto, providing air cover and bombing targets throughout Okinawa. On 2 April, several kamikazes attempted to strike Lunga Point, all of them being shot down before they came close. However, several transports were damaged and the destroyer  was heavily damaged in the attack, subsequently being scuttled on 4 April. On 3 April, whilst making a turn, Lunga Point rolled 23 degrees, flinging an FM-2 Wildcat and a lookout off the deck. The lookout was quickly recovered. Lunga Point remained in support of the operation providing air cover, pounding enemy ground targets in the Ryukyu Islands and fighting off constant kamikaze attacks. She completed this duty without mishap, and returned to Leyte on 27 June.

This was followed by a minesweeping operation west of Okinawa in early July, and on 1 August, she departed on an anti-shipping sweep along the Chinese coast from Shanghai northward. On 5 August, Wildcats from Lunga Point downed a Yokosuka P1Y, the last recorded kill by a Wildcat, which had, in the service of escort carriers, shot down a recorded total of 422 Japanese aircraft. On 6 August, an air contingent was sent to attack Japanese installations near Tinghai Harbor, southeast of Shanghai, including an airfield. On 7 August, further strikes were deemed unproductive, and she sailed to Buckner Bay, Okinawa, where she received news of the Japanese peace offerings on 15 August.

Postwar
In late August the ship, attached to the 5th Fleet, aided in repatriating Allied prisoners of war (POWs) from the ports of Wakayama and Nagasaki. On 15 September, she arrived, steered through Japanese minefields, in the port of Wakayama. On 19 September she transported 760 men of various nationalities to Okinawa. The captain was obliged to assign two men to a bunk to accommodate the ex-POWs. She then unloaded her cargo in Manila harbor. She was ordered to Tokyo Bay in early October, and en route took part in the unsuccessful search for Rear Admiral W. D. Sample missing in a PBM Mariner on a patrol flight. Lunga Point stood out of Tokyo Bay 28 October, and arrived at Pearl Harbor on 7 November. She sailed to San Diego arriving on 15 November, and made voyages to the Pacific before returning to the west coast early in 1946.

On 24 October 1946, the ship was decommissioned and became part of the Pacific Reserve Fleet, Tacoma, Pacific Reserve Fleet. She was reclassified CVU-94 on 12 June 1955 and AKV-32 on 7 May 1959. She was struck from the Navy list on 1 April 1960, and sold at San Diego to Hyman Michaels Co. on 25 July 1960. Later in the year, she was broken up in Japan.

References

Sources

Online sources

Bibliography

Further reading

External links

 
 

 

Casablanca-class escort carriers
World War II escort aircraft carriers of the United States
Ships built in Vancouver, Washington
1944 ships
S4-S2-BB3 ships